Laurence Cristiaan David Shahlaei (born 25 December 1982) is an English YouTuber, strength sports commentator, analyst, coach,  and a retired strongman and powerlifting competitor. Shahlaei is a winner of England's Strongest Man, Britain's Strongest Man and Europe's Strongest Man competitions, and an 11 time entrant and 5 time finalist of the prestigious World's Strongest Man competition.

Early life
Shahlaei was born in Cheltenham, Gloucestershire, his father is Iranian from Kermanshah and his mother is English from Newcastle upon Tyne. He attended Balcarras School, and later moved to Stroud, Gloucestershire.

Strongman career
Shahlaei started strongman training in 2005 and entered his first novice competition that year, where he finished 8th. Within two years, he entered his first Britain's Strongest Man ("BSM"), having won the Midlands qualifier. In that competition, he made a huge impact, making it to the final, only to tear his biceps in the tyre flip, which forced him to withdraw. He won the Midlands qualifier again in 2008, and once again made the final, this time finishing 4th behind Jimmy Marku, Terry Hollands, and Mark Felix. This placing landed him an invite to the World's Strongest Man in 2008. He did not make the final.

In 2009, four years after beginning strongman, he became the UKSC Midlands Strongest Man and also won the UKSC England's Strongest Man, citing this, alongside his WSM 2008 squat win, as the greatest moment of his career (the WSM qualifier titled "England's Strongest Man", which replaced the Britain's Strongest Man contest in 2009, was won by Terry Hollands and Shahlaei did not compete in that). His favourite strongman events are the Squat for reps, Farmer's walk and Super Yoke because those are a good test of natural strength coupled with his world class grip strength (having closed the Captains of Crush No. 3 gripper). His least favourite strongman event is the Atlas stones.

In his career spanning across 15 years, Shahlaei has competed in 55 international competitions and have won 8 of them including his best win, the 2016 Europe's Strongest Man. He also managed to win the 4th place at the 2011 World's Strongest Man while securing 7th, 9th, 9th and 10th places in 2017, 2009, 2014 and 2016. Laurence also competed in the inaugural World's Ultimate Strongman competition in Dubai at the Bab al-Shams Arena in October 2018. He won the 5th place from a stacked field of 12. He also won the 7th place in the 2012 Arnold Strongman Classic which is widely considered the heaviest and the most difficult strongman competition in the world. His final competition was 2021 Giants Live Strongman Classic where he won 7th place.

Since retiring from the sport of strongman, Laurence has become a popular analyst and commentator alongside his wife Elizabeth, affectionately nicknamed "Aunty Liz" by fans.

Personal records
In powerlifting
Squat max:  (2020 Tattooed and Strong)
Bench press max:  (2020 Tattooed and Strong)
Deadlift max:  (2016 Tattooed and Strong)
Total:  (365|220|375) (2017 GPC-GB Salisbury Qualifier)

In strongman
Squat:  x 12 reps (2017 World's Strongest Man)
Log press:  (2011 SCL South Africa)
Axle press:  (2010 Giants Live Turkey)
Deadlift:  (2014 Europe's Strongest Man)
Dumbbell press:  x 4 repetitions (2018 Giants Live North American Open)
Dumbbell press:  x 8 repetitions (2017 UK's Strongest Man)
Car Walk:  for 20 meters in 11.05 secs (2016 Europe's Strongest Man)

Other
Current world record holder in the Dinnie Stone carry in farmers walk style – 14 ft 10 in
Closing the Captains of Crush No.3 gripper

Other work
Shahlaei has said that he would like to set up a sports-related business in the future, but his dream is to become an actor. He had a role in The Golden Compass (2007). On 19 August 2011, Shahlaei competed on Deal or No Deal, where he won £20,000 and lifted presenter Noel Edmonds up above his head. In August 2012, Shahlaei opened a personal training business in Swindon, Wiltshire. Laurence has since written various training programs which he sells via his website, as well as various other merchandise labeled 'Team Loz'.

Shahlaei and Liz maintain a YouTube channel Big Loz Official which is sponsored by 'Mirafit', a popular strength and conditioning equipment Store in the UK. Since 2016, the channel has covered many strongman-related topics including training, event coverage, athletes and competition analysis, strongman history, and live Q&A sessions with strongman fans, and has released more than 1,000 videos.

On 2 May 2020, Shahlaei was the official commentator on Björnsson's 501 kg world record deadlift done in World's Ultimate Strongman Feats of Strength series during the 2020 Coronavirus pandemic. He was also the official commentator along with Brian Shaw at the 2022 Rogue Invitational.

Personal life
Shahlaei and his wife, Elizabeth (Liz) Mason, live in Swindon, Wiltshire. They have 3 kids daughters Ava, Alexa and son Lewis, whom Shahlaei described as his greatest achievements. Shahlaei has been open about his struggles with depression.

References

External links
Profile on Official WSM site

1982 births
Living people
English strength athletes
Iranian strength athletes
British people of Iranian descent
Sportspeople from Cheltenham
British strength athletes